Blood Visions is the debut studio album by American punk rock singer and songwriter Jay Reatard, formerly of the Reatards.

The track, "Oh It's Such a Shame" has been covered by Deerhunter (for the "Fluorescent Grey/Oh, It's Such a Shame" split single) and more recently by Arcade Fire during their support tour for The Suburbs.

Just prior to Jay Reatard's death in 2010, he sold the rights to the record to Fat Possum Records, after which In the Red Records ceased production and distribution of the record.

The album was reissued on Record Store Day in 2016 as an exclusive 10th anniversary 12" on red vinyl, featuring a gatefold jacket and bonus 7" of Blood Visions demos. The release was limited to 2000 copies.

Critical reception

The music review online magazine Pitchfork Media, placed Blood Visions at number 200 on their list of top 200 albums of the 2000s.

Track listing

Musicians
 Jay Reatard - vocals, guitar, bass, drums
 Alix Brown - bass on "I See You Standing There" and vocals on "We Who Wait"

References

2006 debut albums
Jay Reatard albums
In the Red Records albums
Fat Possum Records albums